General elections were held in Guam on November 2, 2004 in order to elect all 15 members of the legislature, the federal delegate, mayors of 14 cities, vice mayors of three cities, the public auditor, the Consolidated Commission on Utilities, two judges of the Superior Court, running for retention and the Guam Public Education Policy Board. Voters also voted on the President of the United States although the territory sent no representatives to the electoral college. There was also a referendum on allowing gambling, which was rejected by voters.

Background
In the United States territory of Guam, elections to the Legislature and multi-member boards are run via open primary (This following the outlawing of the previous blanket primary similar to Louisiana).

Both the Public Auditor and Consolidated Commission on Utilities are required to be nonpartisan and as such candidates are not allowed to state affiliations or list them on the ballot.

In the case of the Auditor, affiliating with a party is grounds for disqualification.

Campaign
A total of 30 candidates ran for 15 seats in the Legislature, with both the Democratic and Republican parties nominating a full slate.

The Guam Bar Association conducted an internal survey to determine feelings towards the two judges running for retention. Both were given strong marks of approval by the less than 100 members.

During the run-up, "Proposition A", the gaming/gambling legalization measure received significant coverage. A group called "Citizens for Economic Diversity" proposed it.

Legislative candidates

Democratic candidates
 Frank B. Aguon Jr. (I)
 John B. Benavente
 Mark C. Charfaurous
 Benjamin J. F. Cruz
 Harold J. Cruz
 Teresita Garrido Cruz
 F. Randall Cundiffe (I)
 Luis P. Duenas
 John E. Farnum
 Judith P. Guthertz
 Romeo M. Hernandez
 Lourdes A. Leon Guerrero (I)
 Sedfrey M. Linsangan
 Tina Muna Barnes (I)  
 Theodore "Ted" S. Nelson
 Adolpho B. Palacios Sr.
 Speaker Vicente C. Pangelinan (I)
 Don Parkinson
 Daniel T. Perez
 John "JQ" M. Quinata (I)
 Rory J. Respicio (I)
 Antoinette D. Sanford (I)
 Judith T.P. Won Pat
 Mark Campos Charfaurous

Republican candidates
 Joanne M. Salas Brown (I)
 Vincent Cristobal Camacho
 Michael W. "Mike" Cruz
 Bertha Mesa Duenas
 Edward J. Baza Calvo
 Christopher M. Duenas
 Sylvia M. Flores
 Mark Forbes
 Victor Anthony Gaza
 Lawrence F. Kasperbauer
 Robert "Bob" Klitzkie
 Jerone T. Landstrom
 Jesse "Jess" Anderson Lujan
 Noel Silan
 Ray Tenorio
 Antonio "Tony" R. Unpingco

Declined
 Dr. Carmen Fernandez (D)

Results

President of the United States
Despite not having any electoral votes, Guam approved of George W. Bush by 64% over John Kerry. Ralph Nader and Michael Badnarik both received less than one percent.

Delegate

Legislature
In the election to the legislature, the top fifteen vote-getters are elected, and the remaining candidates aren't. A recount was held due to the closeness of the vote counts of the critical 15th/16th candidates. As a result, Joanne Brown (Republican), an incumbent, pushed then Speaker Ben Pangelinan into 16th place with a two-vote lead.

Auditor

Utilities Commission

Judicial retention
Both judges standing for retention kept their seats by large majorities.

Education board
Elections for the Guam Education Policy Board suffered for a shortage of candidates: Only in the district of Luchan were there more running then returned (4, including write-in, for two seats). In the other two 2 seat districts, the second had to be filled by write-in, and in the 3 seat Lagu district, NO candidates were on the ballot, resulting in a 100% write-in return.

Mayors
Ten Republican mayors were elected against four Democratic mayors and all three vice mayors. The vice mayor of Barrigada, June Blas was elected without opposition.

Referendum

References

2004
2004 Guam elections
General election
2004
2004 referendums
2004